Jonathan Levine (born 1976) is an American film director and screenwriter.

Jonathan Levine may also refer to:
Jonathan LeVine (born 1968), New York City art dealer
Jon Levine, Canadian producer, songwriter and musician
Jon Levine (tennis) (born 1963), American former tennis player
Jon Levine (neuroscientist), American neuroscientist

See also
Jonathan Levin (disambiguation)